Enrique Rustia Apacible III, popularly known as John Apacible (January 22, 1973 – March 20, 2011) was a Filipino television and film actor.

Early life
He was born in Cainta, Rizal on January 22, 1973.

Career
John Apacible's showbiz career took off in 1996 when he was launched as a leading man in Joey Gosiengfiao's film Nights of Serafina. Among his showbiz contemporaries also launched in the movie were Georgia Ortega (in her first title role) and Angelika dela Cruz. His hunk image enabled him to land successive leading man roles in various sexy films. Eventually he moved on to playing character roles in both TV and film.

Apacible appeared in other movies such as Init ng Laman (1998) starring Sunshine Cruz, Bakit Pa? (1999) starring Jessa Zaragoza and Diether Ocampo, Luksong Tinik (1999) starring Lorna Tolentino, Phone Sex (1999) starring Ara Mina, Sugatang Puso (2000) starring Christopher de Leon and Lorna Tolentino, Tikim (2001) with Rodel Velayo, Hustler (2001) with Ricardo Cepeda and Maria Isabel Lopez, Sex Files (2002) with Halina Perez, Pinky Amador and Ana Capri, Nympha (2003) starring Maricar de Mesa, Takaw-tingin (2004) with Ynez Veneracion, then Lagot Ka Sa Kuya Ko (2006) starring Ronnie Ricketts and Pacquiao: The Movie (2006) starring Jericho Rosales.

Apacible's last television appearance was on ABS-CBN's Minsan Lang Kita Iibigin where he played a commandant of lead star Coco Martin. He became popular in the 1990s.

Death
John Apacible died on March 20, 2011, when his uncle shot him during a drinking session.

Filmography

Television

Film

References

External links

1973 births
2011 deaths
People from Quezon City
People from Cainta
Male actors from Rizal
People murdered in the Philippines
Filipino murder victims
Deaths by firearm in the Philippines
Burials at the Libingan ng mga Bayani
Filipino film actors
Filipino male television actors
ABS-CBN personalities
GMA Network personalities